During the 1939–40 season, Birmingham Football Club played three Second Division matches before the Football League season was abandoned because of the Second World War. The team had been relegated in 1938–39 after 18 consecutive seasons in the top tier. Regionally based competitions were organised so that football could continue while unnecessary travel was minimised. Birmingham played in the Midland Regional League, finishing fourth of eight teams, and in the Football League War Cup, in which they lost to eventual winners West Ham United in the quarter final.

Background
After 18 consecutive seasons in the First Division, Birmingham were relegated at the end of the 1938–39 Football League campaign. Manager George Liddell resigned, and returned to his former career as a schoolteacher. First-team coach Jack Bestall also left the club. No successors were appointed. Trainer Billy Gibson's duties were extended to include coaching, and Jack Foster, formerly chief scout at Portsmouth, was appointed to the corresponding role at Birmingham. The directors stated that they were "prepared to accept Mr Foster's advice in all matters relating to players", but confirmed that they would act promptly if it became necessary to appoint a manager.

During the previous season, 1500 new tip-up seats had been installed and the terracing in front of the grandstand completely renovated. Over the close season, the pitch was replanted and reseeded.

Player departures included goalkeeper Frank Clack and half-backs Wally Halsall, Bob Meacock and Dai Richards.

Football League Second Division

Birmingham began the 1939–40 Football League season in the Second Division, but the onset of the Second World War caused the League to be abandoned after three rounds of Second Division matches had been played. They fielded the same eleven for all three matches: Harry Hibbs, Cyril Trigg, Billy Hughes, James Bye, Arthur Turner, Ray Shaw, Jackie Brown, Don Dearson, Ted Duckhouse, Fred Harris and Tom Farrage. Farrage was killed in action in September 1944, serving as a private in the 10th Battalion, the Parachute Regiment during Operation Market Garden. With two wins and a draw, they stood second in the table, behind Luton Town on goal average.

League table (part)

Midland Regional League

When war was declared in September 1939, the government banned public gatherings until safety implications could be assessed. Most football grounds reopened soon afterwards, even those in built-up or strategically significant areas, but Birmingham's Chief Constable ordered the continued closure of St Andrew's because of its proximity to likely air-raid targets such as the BSA munitions factories. Consequently, Birmingham were forced to play all their away fixtures first, and when this became impossible, to play home fixtures on a neutral groundthe Windmill Ground at Leamington hosted two "home" matches. The matter was first raised in Parliament in November 1939, but the Home Secretary was unwilling to intervene in what he perceived as a local issue outside his jurisdiction. By March 1940, when St Andrew's had for some time been the only football ground in England still closed, the Chief Constable bowed to public pressure, and a crowd of 13,241 witnessed Birmingham's first home game in more than six months, against Walsall in the Midland Regional League.

League table

Football League War Cup

Appearances and goals

For a description of the playing formation, see formation (association football)#2–3–5 (Pyramid).

Players marked with an asterisk * were guests, not registered Birmingham players.

References
General
 
 
 
 Source for kit: 

Specific

Birmingham City F.C. seasons
Birmingham